A khata or khatag is a traditional ceremonial scarf in Tibetan Buddhism and in tengerism. It originated in Tibetan culture and is common in cultures and countries where Tibetan Buddhism is practiced or has strong influence.

History
Tibetan people used to give animal skins as gifts because there was no silk in Tibet. According to the Bon historical record, people would put sheep wool around their necks during the time of the ninth king, Degong Jayshi, and head for some religious rituals. This tradition was passed down from that moment onwards. People began making scarves and using silk over time.  So, the scarf replaced the plain sheep’s wool and people put scarves on the neck and head.

Uses and types
The khata symbolizes purity and compassion and is worn or presented with incense at many ceremonial occasions, including births, weddings, funerals, graduations and the arrival or departure of guests. When given as a farewell gesture it symbolizes a safe journey. When given to arriving guests it symbolizes welcome. They were usually made of silk but now much more commonly cotton or polyester. Tibetan khatas are usually white, symbolising the pure heart of the giver, though it is quite common to find yellow-gold khata as well. Tibetan, Nepali, and Bhutanese khatas feature the ashtamangala. There are also special multi-colored khatas. Mongolian khatas are usually blue, symbolizing the blue sky. In Mongolia, khatas are also often tied to ovoos, stupas, or special trees and rocks.

Notes

References 

Tibetan clothing
Scarves
Buddhist ritual implements
Buddhist symbols
Tibetan Buddhist art and culture
Tibetan Buddhist ritual implements
History of Asian clothing